Nour Fadi Noujaim (born 6 February 2004) is a Lebanese footballer who plays as a defender for American college team Coker Cobras.

Club career

Lebanon 
Between 2012 and 2016, Noujaim played at youth level in a boy's club. She joined Zouk Mosbeh in 2016, playing for their under-17, under-19 and senior teams until 2018. Noujaim then moved to SAS, playing one year for the under-17, under-19 and senior teams, before joining EFP in 2019, also playing for their youth and senior teams.

United States 
Noujaim played for Central Methodist Eagles, the team of the Central Methodist University. On 28 March 2022, she moved to Iowa Raptors FC in the Women's Premier Soccer League.

In 2022, she joined Coker Cobras, Coker University's team. She was nominated Athlete of the Month in August by the university, and was named to the South Atlantic Conference (SAC) All-Conference Third Team for 2022.

International career 
Noujaim represented Lebanon internationally at under-15, under-16, under-18 and under-19 levels. She made her senior debut for Lebanon on 8 April 2021, as a starter in a friendly tournament against Armenia.

Personal life 
Noujaim attended the Collège des Sœurs des Saints Cœurs – Beit Chabab. In 2022, she enrolled at Coker University to major in business administration.

Honours 
Zouk Mosbeh
 Lebanese Women's Football League: 2017–18
 Lebanese Women's FA Cup: 2016–17, 2017–18
 Lebanese Women's Super Cup: 2017

SAS
 Lebanese Women's Football League: 2018–19
 Lebanese Women's FA Cup: 2018–19
 WAFF Women's Clubs Championship runner-up: 2019

EFP
 Lebanese Women's FA Cup: 2020–21

Lebanon U15
 WAFF U-15 Girls Championship runner-up: 2018

Lebanon U18
 WAFF U-18 Girls Championship: 2019

Individual
 South Atlantic Conference All-Conference Third Team: 2022

See also
 List of Lebanon women's international footballers

References

External links
 Profile at WPSL
 Profile at Coker Cobras
 
 

2004 births
Living people
People from Matn District
Lebanese women's footballers
Women's association football defenders
Zouk Mosbeh SC footballers
Stars Association for Sports players
Eleven Football Pro players
Central Methodist Eagles women's soccer players
Iowa Raptors FC (women) players
Lebanese Women's Football League players
Women's Premier Soccer League players
Lebanon women's youth international footballers
Lebanon women's international footballers
Lebanese expatriate women's footballers
Lebanese expatriate sportspeople in the United States
Expatriate women's soccer players in the United States
Coker University alumni